Loveland Bay Provincial Park is a provincial park on Vancouver Island, British Columbia, Canada, located on the north side of Campbell Lake, just west of the city of Campbell River.

References

Provincial parks of British Columbia
Mid Vancouver Island
1966 establishments in British Columbia
Protected areas established in 1966